HO Telescopii is an eclipsing binary star system located in the southern constellation of Telescopium. The maximum apparent visual magnitude of 8.22 is too faint to be visible to the naked eye. The system is located at a distance of approximately 910 light years based on parallax. The combined stellar classification of the system is A7III(m), matching an evolved A-type star that is possibly metallic-lined. The system is around 1.1 billion years old and consists of two stars of similar mass and size.

The variability of this system was discovered by W. Strohmeier, R. Knigge, and H. Ott in 1965. It is a detached binary system with both components filling three-fourths of their respective Roche lobes. Their orbital period is  days with a circularized orbit, and the orbital plane is inclined by 83° to the line of sight from the Earth; close to edge-on. As a consequence, they form an Algol-like eclipsing binary with a magnitude decrease of 0.51 during the primary eclipse and 0.45 during the secondary eclipse.

References

A-type giants
Am stars
Algol variables
Eclipsing binaries

Telescopium (constellation)
Durchmusterung objects
187418
097756
Telescopii, HO